The 1994 Arkansas State Indians football team represented Arkansas State University as a member of the Big West Conference during the 1994 NCAA Division I-A football season. Led by second-year head coach John Bobo, the Indians compiled an overall record of 1–10 with a mark of 0–6 in conference play, placing last out of ten teams in the Big West.

Schedule

References

Arkansas State
Arkansas State Red Wolves football seasons
Arkansas State Indians football